Yalasarat al-Hussein ( "Those Who Want to Avenge the Blood of Hussein") simply known as Yalasarat, is a Persian language weekly newspaper and news website serving as the official media outlet of Ansar-e Hezbollah.

See also

List of newspapers in Iran

References

1994 establishments in Iran
Iranian news websites
Newspapers published in Tehran
Persian-language newspapers
Publications established in 1994
Weekly newspapers